Ministikwan 161A is an Indian reserve of the Ministikwan Lake Cree Nation in Saskatchewan. It is 177 kilometres northwest of North Battleford. In the 2016 Canadian Census, it recorded a population of 223 living in 40 of its 42 total private dwellings. In the same year, its Community Well-Being index was calculated at 35 of 100, compared to 58.4 for the average First Nations community and 77.5 for the average non-Indigenous community.

References

Indian reserves in Saskatchewan
Division No. 17, Saskatchewan